Ramiro Gabriel Sordo (born 29 June 2000) is an Argentine professional footballer who plays as a winger for Newell's Old Boys.

Career
Sordo started his youth career with amateur club Belgrano (Las Rosas), prior to moving to the academy of Newell's Old Boys in 2012. After eight years progressing through their ranks, the winger made his breakthrough into their first-team in mid-2020 under manager Frank Darío Kudelka. He was initially an unused substitute for a Copa de la Liga Profesional defeat away to Talleres on 30 October, before making his senior debut in the same competition on 9 November in a home loss to Boca Juniors.

Career statistics
.

Notes

References

External links

2000 births
Living people
People from Belgrano Department, Santa Fe
Argentine footballers
Association football forwards
Newell's Old Boys footballers
Sportspeople from Santa Fe Province